Plus, also known as +, is a 2015 Indian Kannada-language suspense drama science-fiction film directed by Gadda Viji and co-produced by Yogaraj Bhat. It stars Anant Nag as the lead protagonist with an image makeover. The supporting cast features Sudharani, Shalini Vadnikatti, P. Ravi Shankar and Chetan Chandra. Shruthi Hariharan appears in a song sequence. Based on the theme of 'good over evil', the plot of the film revolves around the life of a businessman trying to save himself being attacked by goons on bringing three persons all suffering from different psychological disorders together.

The soundtrack was composed by Bharath B. J., who collaborated with Ravi Basrur to score the background music. After a lot of hype surrounding the makers' innovative marketing strategy around Ananth Nag's new look; Upon theatrical release on 16 October 2015, the film was panned by critics for being complicated and ambiguous.

Cast

 Anant Nag as Jaii
 Chetan Chandra as Vivek
 Shalini Vadnikatti as Nidhi
 Sudharani as Jai's wife
 Aishani Shetty
 P. Ravi Shankar as Rankasura
 Achyuth Kumar
 Suchendra Prasad
 B. Suresha
 Kari Subbu
 Prashanth Siddi
 Shweta Pandit
 Gourish Akki
 Danny
 Devu
 Niranjan
 Pawan Kumar
 Shruthi Hariharan and Ritesh in a special appearance in song "Sunday Banthu"

Soundtrack 

Bharath B. J. and Ravi Basrur scored the film's background music, and Bharath composed for its soundtrack. The lyrics for the soundtrack was written by Yogaraj Bhat, Goravi Aalduru and Nagesh Prasanna. The soundtrack album consists of ten tracks. It was released in Bangalore on 4 July 2015 in the form of pen-drives.

Track listing

Reception
The Times of India wrote that "The makers tried to call this a medical and science fiction thriller. Though, it ends up being just an experimental good-versus-evil commercial drama". The Hindu wrote that "Plus makes you wonder if storytelling is really that difficult". Deccan Chronicle wrote that "After a recent 'senseless' movie, here is a 'mindless' one, and all credit goes to the director who has positively managed to showcase his talent of making the worst movie ever".

References

External links

2015 films
2015 drama films
2010s Kannada-language films
Indian drama films